Leon Ford is an Australian actor who has appeared in many television and theatre productions. He is best known for his roles in the television series The Cooks, Changi and the telemovie Stepfather of the Bride.

Biography
Ford portrayed 1st Lt. Edward 'Hillbilly' Jones in the Emmy award-winning HBO miniseries The Pacific, which follows the story of World War II Marines through different battles of the Pacific theater of war.

He has also appeared in many other television series including All Saints, East West 101 and McLeod's Daughters, the 2005 movie The Great Raid and voiced a character in the 2008 stop motion animated movie $9.99.

Stage roles include playing pious charlatan Tartuffe in the 2014 Bell Shakespeare version of Tartuffe, based on the French play originally written by Molière.

In addition to acting, he is also both a director and screenwriter. In 2010, Ford both wrote and directed the movie Griff the Invisible, starring Ryan Kwanten as a man who is bullied by his coworkers during the day, but a superhero by night. The film premiered at the 2010 Toronto International Film Festival (TIFF), where it was well received by audiences and critics. Ford attended Binger Filmlab in 2008, where he developed feature film The Mechanicals.

Ford is also an accomplished author. In 2009, penned the story "What Doesn't Kill You", the story of a man waking up to find that, instead of the ideal life he'd been living, everything has gone horribly wrong overnight. He wakes up in the wrong house, his wife doesn't love him anymore, he doesn't have a job anymore, and one of his friends betrayed him in the worst possible way. Plus his car exploded.

References

External links

Year of birth missing (living people)
Australian male film actors
Australian male stage actors
Australian male television actors
Australian male voice actors
Living people
People educated at Narrabundah College